Orme Caldara (born Frank Slocum; February 9, 1875 – October 21, 1925) was an American stage actor. He was married to actress Julia Dean from 1906-1913. Caldara appeared in one motion picture, The Spreading Dawn with Jane Cowl. He often appeared with Cowl in the theatre co-starring with her in several influential Broadway plays including Within the Law (1912–1913), Common Clay (1915–1916), Lilac Time (1917), and Smilin' Through (1919–1920).

Caldara contracted tuberculosis in the early 1920s, and his ailing health forced him to retire from his stage career. He died of the disease in a sanatorium in Saranac Lake, New York in 1925.

Biography
Caldara was born Frank Slocum on February 9, 1875 in Empire City, Oregon. His father, Caleb Slocum, was a native of Peoria, Illinois. Caldara was working as a stage actor by 1898, when he was a leading member of the Lorraine Hollis Company. He began appearing on Broadway in 1904, and performed in numerous productions until 1920.

In addition to acting, Caldara was also a professional swimmer.

Death
Caldara contracted tuberculosis in the early 1920s, and his ailing health forced him into an early retirement. He died of the disease in a tuberculosis sanatorium in Saranac Lake, New York on October 21, 1925.

Filmography

Select stage credits

References

Sources

External links

Orme Caldara at Find-a-Grave
Portraits (New York Public Library, Billy Rose collection)

1875 births
1925 deaths
American male stage actors
Male actors from Oregon
People from Coos Bay, Oregon
Tuberculosis deaths in New York (state)
20th-century deaths from tuberculosis